Thomas "Moose" Praytor IV (born February 28, 1990) is an American professional stock car racing driver who currently competes part-time in the ARCA Menards Series, driving the No. 9 Chevrolet for his family team, Max Force Racing.

Racing career

Praytor started racing at eight years old in a borrowed yard kart from a family friend. He quickly progressed from karts to Bandoleros, where Praytor would drive one that was sponsored by The Outdoor Channel. He later began racing late models, running in the Southeast and picking up three US Army Rookie of the Year titles, local and state titles. Praytor and the Max Force Racing team earned the Ironman Status of the Gulf Coast competing in every Pro and Super Late Model Race at Mobile International Speedway and Five Flags Speedway while finishing in the top 10 of the Championship standings at both tracks.

Praytor made his first ARCA Racing Series start at the inaugural ARCA Mobile 200 at the Mobile International Speedway in 2012. He made later starts at Talladega Superspeedway and also saw starts with Venturini Motorsports. In the 2013 season, Praytor ran for rookie of the year as it was his first full season in ARCA. He drove the No. 2 Ford/Chevrolet for Hixson Motorsports and finished the season ninth in points and also earning the HG Adcox Sportsmanship Award. Returning to the Hixson No. 2 in 2014, Praytor acquired sponsorship DK-LOK Fittings and Valves and ended the season eighth in points. Praytor was also named the Hard Charger Driver after the Herr's Chase the Taste 200 in Winchester. For the 2015 season, Praytor and his father Tommy started their team, Max Force Racing, which fielded the No. 9 DK-LOK Ford for Praytor, who would finish ninth in points. The team was named in memory of Thomas's brother Max, who died in June 2001. 

Praytor statistically had his best season in 2016. Competing in all 20 events and earning 4 top-10 finishes, he went on to finish 5th in season points. The following year, Praytor dropped to seventh in points, not earning a top-10 that year but still having a consistent season overall.

In 2018, the team would cut back their schedule, only running the first four races before taking a break. The team would return to field their No. 9 car for Jesse Iwuji at Chicago. Additionally, the Max Force team entered a second car at Daytona, the No. 99, for Ronnie Osmer. Their only races in 2019 came at Talladega, where Praytor would finish 20th in the race. Their next race would not come until Daytona in 2020, where it was later revealed that they took most of the 2019 season off so Praytor could spend time with his newborn son, (Hugh) Thomas Praytor V.

Personal life

Praytor was born and raised in Mobile, Alabama, and is the son of local realtor and owner of Praytor Realty, Thomas ("Tommy") Praytor III, who also used to drive racecars.

Praytor is nicknamed "Moose". The name derived from one of Praytor's first cars being sponsored by The Outdoor Channel and featuring a giant Moose coming out of the rear wheel well. When that paint scheme was run, the name "Thomas" above the window net on the car was changed to "Thomoose", which was later shortened to "Moose" and the nickname stuck. Every car Praytor has driven since then has had "Thomoose Praytor" above the window net.

Praytor is a weekly host on the Inside ARCA Racing radio show on WNSP, a station in his home state of Alabama. Praytor's segment, the "Moose Call", is named after his nickname.

In 2008, Praytor's team had a car for sale, which led to a partnership with Warner Brothers Pictures for the film series Final Destination fourth installment, The Final Destination. Filmed at Mobile International Speedway, Praytor and fellow driver David Ellis worked as stunt drivers for the film.

During the 2013 season, Praytor joined up with Alabama Crimson Tide quarterback A. J. McCarron to design a McCarron replica helmet; Praytor wore the helmet at Daytona International Speedway and Talladega, after which it was donated to the Alabama Institute of the Deaf and Blind to benefit the annual Race Fever Action.

On May 9, 2022, it was revealed that Praytor was diagnosed with rhabdomyolysis. On lap 5 of the 2022 General Tire 200, Praytor lost movement in his left arm and leg. He would drive with his right hand, until the red flag came out with 10 laps to go. He went through a driver change, with Sean Corr taking over his car for the remaining 10 laps. Medical personnel removed Praytor from the car, where he was transported to the infield care center. He had flu-like symptoms just a few days prior to the race.

Motorsports career results

ARCA Menards Series
(key) (Bold – Pole position awarded by qualifying time. Italics – Pole position earned by points standings or practice time. * – Most laps led.)

 Season still in progress
 Ineligible for series points

References

External links

Living people
ARCA Menards Series drivers
1990 births
Racing drivers from Alabama